Moore Lake or Lake Moore may refer to:

Moore Lake (Alberta), a lake in Alberta, Canada
Lake Moore, New South Wales, a lake in Australia
Moore Lake (Wright County, Minnesota), a lake in Minnesota
Moore Reservoir, a lake in New Hampshire and Vermont